Heavenly Body may refer to:
Heavenly Body (manga), a manga written by Takashi Kanzaki
Heavenly Body (film), a film directed by Alice Rohrwacher